Justas Vincas Paleckis (born 1 January 1942 in Kuybyshev, current Samara) is a Lithuanian ex-communist and politician, signatory of the Act of the Re-Establishment of the State of Lithuania, and Member of the European Parliament for the Social Democratic Party of Lithuania.

He is also a member of the Party of European Socialists. Justas was born in Samara, Russia where his family resided during the Second World War. His father, served as the Acting President of Lithuania in 1940 and later as the head of state of the Lithuanian SSR until 1967. After the war, the family returned to Lithuania, where he finished school in 1959 and then went on to study journalism at Vilnius University in 1964.

Personal life 
J. Paleckis is married and has two sons and one daughter, Algirdas and Rimvydas and Justina respectively.

External links
The Representative of Lithuanians in European Parliament Justas Paleckis

1942 births
Living people
Lithuanian diplomats
Social Democratic Party of Lithuania MEPs
MEPs for Lithuania 2004–2009
MEPs for Lithuania 2009–2014
Vilnius University alumni
Lithuanian male water polo players
Children of national leaders
Members of the Seimas